Hitchhiking (also known as thumbing, autostop or hitching) is a means of transportation that is gained by asking individuals, usually strangers, for a ride in their car or other vehicle. The ride is usually, but not always, free.

Nomads have also used hitchhiking as a primary mode of travel for the better part of the last century, and continue to do so today.

Signaling methods
Hitchhikers use a variety of signals to indicate they need a ride. Indicators can be physical gestures or displays including written signs. The physical gestures, e.g., hand signals, hitchhikers use differ around the world: 
In some African countries, the hitchhiker's hand is held with the palm facing upwards.
In most of Europe , North America and Australia, most hitchhikers stand with their back facing the direction of travel. The hitchhiker typically extends their arm towards the road with the thumb of the closed hand pointing upward or in the direction of vehicle travel.  

In 1971, during the Vietnam War, drivers invented methods to communicate various messages to hitchhikers (frequently soldiers in those areas of the U.S. near military bases). To indicate to a hitchhiking soldier that their vehicles have no additional space to accommodate them, drivers could tap on the vehicle roof. Another common message that drivers could signal to hitchhikers—who usually sought to travel long distances, distances too far to walk in a reasonable amount of time—was that the driver's destinations were located nearby—and of little use to the hitchhiker—by pointing at the ground for a few seconds.

Legal status

Hitchhiking is a historically common (autonomous) practice worldwide and hence there are very few places in the world where laws exist to restrict it. However, a minority of countries have laws that restrict hitchhiking at certain locations. In the United States, for example, some local governments have laws outlawing hitchhiking, on the basis of drivers' and hitchhikers' safety. In 1946, New Jersey arrested and imprisoned a hitchhiker, leading to intervention by the American Civil Liberties Union. In Canada, several highways have restrictions on hitchhiking, particularly in British Columbia and the 400-series highways in Ontario. In all countries in Europe, it is legal to hitchhike and in some places even encouraged.  However, worldwide, even where hitchhiking is permitted, laws forbid hitchhiking where pedestrians are banned, such as the Autobahn (Germany), Autostrade (Italy), motorways (United Kingdom and continental Europe, with the exception of, at least, Lithuania) or interstate highways (United States), although hitchhikers often obtain rides at entrances and truck stops where it is legal at least throughout Europe  with the exception of Italy.

Decline
In 2011, Freakonomics Radio reviewed sparse data about hitchhiking, and identified a decline in hitchhiking in the US since the 1970s, which it attributed to a number of factors, including lower air travel costs due to deregulation, the presence of more money in the economy to pay for travel, more numerous and more reliable cars, and a lack of trust of strangers. Fear of hitchhiking is thought to have been spurred by movies such as The Texas Chain Saw Massacre (1974) and a few real stories of imperiled passengers, notably the kidnapping of Colleen Stan in California. See , below.

Julian Portis points out that the rise of faster highways, such as freeways, motorways, and expressways, has made hitchhiking more difficult. He adds:

Some British researchers discuss reasons for hitchhiking's decline in the UK, and possible means of reviving it in safer and more-organized forms.

In recent years, hitchhikers have started efforts to strengthen their community. Examples include the annual Hitchgathering, an event organized by hitchhikers, for hitchhikers, and websites such as hitchwiki and hitchbase, which are platforms for hitchhikers to share tips and provide a way of looking up good hitchhiking spots around the world. While hitchhiking is on the decline, it is still in regular use around the globe.

Public policy support
Since the mid-2010s, local authorities in rural areas in Germany have started to support hitch-hiking, and this has spread to Austria and the German-speaking region of Belgium. The objectives are both social and environmental: as ridesharing improves mobility for local residents (particularly young and old people without their own cars) in places where public transport is inadequate, thus improving networking among local communities in an environmentally friendly way. This support typically takes the form of providing hitch-hiking benches (in German Mitfahrbänke) where people hoping for a ride can wait for cars. These benches are usually brightly coloured and located at the exit from a village, sometimes at an existing bus stop lay-by where vehicles can pull in safely. Some are even provided with large fold-out or slide-out signs with place names allowing hitchers to clearly signal where they want to go. Some Mitfahrbänke have been installed with the help of the EU's LEADER programme for rural local development

In Austria, Mitfahrbänke are especially common in Lower Austria and Tyrol, and are promoted by the Federal Ministry of Agriculture, Regions and Tourism under its klimaaktiv climate protection initiative. In 2018 the Tyrolean MobilitäterInnen network published a Manual for the Successful Introduction of Hitch-hiking Benches.

Safety

Limited data is available regarding the safety of hitchhiking. Compiling good safety data requires counting hitchhikers, counting rides, and counting problems: a difficult task.

Two studies on the topic include a 1974 California Highway Patrol study and a 1989 German federal police (Bundeskriminalamt Wiesbaden) study . The California study found that hitchhikers were not disproportionately likely to be victims of crime. The German study concluded that the actual risk is much lower than the publicly perceived risk; the authors did not advise against hitchhiking in general. They found that in some cases there were verbal disputes or inappropriate comments, but physical attacks were very rare.

Recommended safety practices include:
 Asking for rides at gas stations instead of signaling at the roadside
 Refusing rides from alcohol impaired drivers
 Hitchhiking during daylight hours
 Trusting one's instincts
 Traveling with another hitchhiker; this measure decreases the likelihood of harm by a factor of six

Around the world

Cuba
In Cuba, picking up hitchhikers is mandatory for government vehicles, if passenger space is available. Hitchhiking is encouraged, as Cuba has few cars, and hitchhikers use designated spots. Drivers pick up waiting riders on a first come, first served basis.

Israel

In Israel, hitchhiking is commonplace at designated locations called  ( in Hebrew, derived from the German ).

Lithuania
Hitchhiking in Lithuania is no longer as common as it used to be, but there are still people soliciting rides, more so in the summer.

It is legal to hitchhike in Lithuania, and the country is unique in Europe in that it is actually legal to hitchhike on the emergency lane of motorways.

Nepal
In Nepal, hitchhiking is very common in rural areas. Many do not own cars so hitchhiking is a common practice especially in and around villages.

Netherlands

In the Netherlands, hitchhiking is legal and un-official signs indicate where one may wait for a ride.  These designated hitchhiking locations are called liftershalte or liftplaats in Dutch, and they are particularly common in university towns.

Poland
Hitchhiking in Poland has a long history and is still popular. It was legalised and formalised  in 1957 so hitchhikers could buy booklets including coupons from travel agencies. These coupons were given to drivers who took hitchhikers. By the end of each season drivers who collected the highest number of coupons could exchange them for prizes, and others took part in a lottery. This so-called "Akcja Autostop" was popular till the end of the 1970s, but the sale of the booklet was discontinued in 1995.

Ireland 
Hitchhiking in Ireland is legal, unless it takes place on motorways. A backpacker will most likely still get a lift if the car has enough space to park. Local police (Gardaí) usually let backpackers get away with a verbal warning.

United States
Hitchhiking became a common method of traveling during the Great Depression and during the 
Counterculture of the 1960s.

Warnings of the potential dangers of picking up hitchhikers were publicized to drivers, who were advised that some hitchhikers would rob drivers and, in some cases, sexually assault or murder them. Other warnings were publicized to the hitchhikers themselves, alerting them to the same types of crimes being carried out by drivers. Still, hitchhiking was part of the American psyche and many people continued to stick out their thumbs, even in states where the practice had been outlawed.

Today, hitchhiking is legal in 44 of the 50 states, provided that the hitchhiker is not standing in the roadway or otherwise hindering the normal flow of traffic. Even in states where hitchhiking is illegal, hitchhikers are rarely ticketed. For example, the Wyoming Highway Patrol approached 524 hitchhikers in 2010, but only eight of them were cited (hitchhiking was subsequently legalized in Wyoming in 2013). Hitchhiking is still in regular practice, but hitchhikers must accept the risks.

In several urban areas, a variation of hitchhiking called slugging occurs, motivated by HOV lanes.

Notable hitchhikers

Notable individual hitchhikers include:
 Douglas Adams; author whose fictional space-travel book, Hitchhiker's Guide to the Galaxy, was inspired whilst hitching in Innsbruck, Austria.
 Joe Bennett – New Zealand newspaper columnist and author; hitchhiked around the world for 10 years.
 André Brugiroux – from France; hitchhiked all around the world for 18 years, from 1955 to 1973.
 Simon Calder – author, broadcaster, journalist and travel correspondent. Has a regular column with The Independent which often features pieces about hitchhiking. Has published some 'classic' guidebook material on thumbing rides in the UK and Europe such as Hitch-Hiker's Manual: Europe (1984, London: Vacation Publishers).
 David Choe – painter, muralist, graffiti artist and graphic novelist, spent two years hitchhiking.
 Martin Clark and Graham Beynon – last hitchhikers recorded in the Guinness Book of Records for the Land's End to John O'Groats trip (17 hours 8 minutes).
 W. H. Davies – Welsh poet and tramp, who hitchhiked America during the early 20th century.
 Sascha Grabow – from Germany; hitchhiked in all but three of the world's 193 countries.
 John Howard Griffin – author, journalist, researcher. Hitched in the Southern States of the US to gauge the levels of racism and discrimination he would face. This resulted in the book (also made into a film) Black Like Me (1961).  
 Tony Hawks—British journalist, comedian  and author. 
 hitchBOT – Canadian hitchhiking robot.
 Ludovic Hubler –  French hitchhiker who toured the world entirely by hitchhiking from 1 January 2003 to 1 January 2008, and wrote Le Monde en stop about his experiences.
 Miran Ipavec – author, former Mayor of Kanal (Slovenia) and curator of what is probably the world's only Hitchhiker's Museum (a travelling exhibition that has had installations in several Slovenian cities, as well as once in Italy). He has published two books about his travels and hitching 'records' which have been translated into several languages: (2013) Tales of Hitchhiking on European Roads. My First Light Second, Kanal: SP. (2020) Hitchhiking Marathon: 42 Countries in 500 Hours. Kanal: SP.    
 Ilmar Island (Saar) – the last and only hitchhiker recorded in the Guinness Book of Records for hitching between Key West, Florida and Fairbanks, Alaska (5 days, 20 hours and 52 minutes); the category only appeared once.
 Jack Kerouac – Beat Generation author who hitchhiked in America and wrote many books about his experience.
 Mark Knopfler hitched much to get around Britain, as well as in Europe such UK to Greece when he was about 17. His song Matchstick Man recounts a Christmas Day hitch from Penzance, after a gig, home to Newcastle, in heavy snow.
 Chris McCandless –  subject of the book Into the Wild and related films; hitchhiked throughout the western region of North America in the early 1990s.
 Robert Prins – first (and only) hitchhiker recorded in the Guinness Book of Records for the 24-hour hitchhiking record (2,318.4 km). His website contains a page with links to a substantial number of academic publications.
 Colleen Stan, who was kidnapped by Cameron and Janice Hooker, and tortured and abused for seven years before Janice helped her escape.
 Kinga Freespirit (b 1973 d 2006) – travel writer, book author; hitched five years in cars, a boat, plane.
 Andrzej Stasiuk – writer, journalist and literary critic.
 John Waters – filmmaker, writer, actor and artist; author of Carsick: John Waters Hitchhikes Across America.
 Nedd Willard – writer, artist and journalist.
 Trevor Daneliuk – Self-proclaimed professional hitchhiker documenting and livestreaming hitchhiking on Twitch.

In popular culture

Film

Literature
 1939 – The Grapes of Wrath, by John Steinbeck, opens with a hitched ride.
 1957 – Jack Kerouac immortalized hitchhiking in his book, On the Road.
 1971 – Ken Welsh's "how to" book on hitchhiking around Europe, titled Hitch-hiker's Guide to Europe, is rumored to have inspired the title of Douglas Adams' 1978 classic book.
 1973 – Kurt Vonnegut's perpetual protagonist, Kilgore Trout, hitchhikes halfway across the country in Breakfast of Champions (also known as Goodbye Blue Monday).
 1976 – Sissy Hankshaw, the protagonist of Even Cowgirls Get the Blues by Tom Robbins, becomes legendary as a hitchhiker in part because of her unusually large thumbs.
 1977 – "The Hitch-Hiker", by Roald Dahl
 1978 – In his cult classic The Hitchhiker's Guide to the Galaxy (first broadcast on radio in 1978), Douglas Adams postulated on interstellar hitchhiking.
 1984 – Science fiction author Robert A. Heinlein described interdimensional hitchhiking in his book Job: A Comedy of Justice.
 1996 – Into the Wild by Jon Krakauer
 1998 – Round Ireland with a Fridge by British comedian Tony Hawks: hitchhiking around Ireland with a refrigerator, as a result of a drunken bet.
 2003 – Evasion by CrimethInc.
 2012 – "Mute" short story by Stephen King about a hitchhiker.
 2019 – Jens Kropp Per Anhalter durchs Leben (Twenty Six) ISBN 9783740749705
 2021 – Escape from The Front by Erwin (Erv) Krause ISBN 978-1-6655-1478-7. Will Kraft encounters a colorful host of characters while hitchhiking to Montana.
 2022 - Solo Female Traveller: What I Learnt from Hitchhiking in 70 Countries by Michaela Kabourkova, stories from a young woman who hitchhiked around the world.

Music

 1936 – "Cross Road Blues" – Robert Johnson
 1941 – "Barstow" – Harry Partch
 1962 – "Hitch Hike" – Marvin Gaye
 1968 – "America" – Simon and Garfunkel
 1969 – "Hitchin' a Ride" – Vanity Fare
 1970 – "Ridin' Thumb" Seals and Crofts – Down Home
 1970 – "Hitchhikin' Woman" – Warren Zevon
 1971 – "Riders on the Storm" – The Doors
 1971 – "The Hitchhikers' Song" – Joan Baez, on Blessed Are...
 1971 – "Me and Bobby McGee" – Kris Kristofferson
 1972 – "Black-Throated Wind" – Grateful Dead
 1972 – "Sweet Hitch Hiker" – Creedence Clearwater Revival
 1972 – "Take It Easy" – Eagles
 1973 – "Chevy Van" – Sammy Johns
 1973 – "Ridin' My Thumb to Mexico" – Johnny Rodriguez
 1974 – "West Nashville Grand Ballroom Gown" – Jimmy Buffett
 1975 – "Jo and the Cowboy" – Johnny Duncan and Janie Fricke
 1976 – "Coyote" – Joni Mitchell
 1976 – "Hitch a Ride" – Boston
 1976 – "Hitchhiker's Hero" – Atlanta Rhythm Section
 1977 – "Rockaway Beach" – Ramones
 1980 - "Autostop (Hitch-Hiking)" - Anna Vissi and The Epikouri
 1984 – "The Pros and Cons of Hitch Hiking" – Roger Waters
 1997 – "Hitchin' a Ride" – Green Day
 2001 – "101 North" – Tomahawk
 2002 – "Thumbing My Way" – Pearl Jam
 2002 – "Blue Sunday" – Tom Petty and the Heartbreakers
 2003 – "Lost Dogs" –  Pearl Jam
 2004 – "Wagon Wheel" – Old Crow Medicine Show
 2006 – "Hitch Hikin' Music" – Classified
 2006 – "Leaving Beirut" – Roger Waters
 2008 – "The Backseat" – The Gaslight Anthem
 2011 – "Hitchhiker" – Neil Young
 2011 – "Paradise" – Coldplay
 2013 – "Hitchhiking" – SHINee

Television
 1960 – "Hitch-Hike", an episode of Alfred Hitchcock Presents based on a short story by Ed Lacy
 1960 – "The Hitch-Hiker", an episode of The Twilight Zone
 1976 – The Secrets of Isis episode 2.17 The Hitchhiker
 1979 - Fat Albert and the Cosby Kids episode "Free Ride"
 1981 – The Hitchhiker's Guide to the Galaxy TV series
 1983 – Andrea's Story: A Hitchhiking Tragedy, an ABC Afterschool Special presentation
 1983 – Quincy, M.E. episode "Beyond the Open Door"
 1983 - The Day After, Made for TV movie aired on ABC.
 1984 – Diff'rent Strokes, a two-part very special episode, "The Hitchhikers"
 1999 – SpongeBob SquarePants – "Pizza Delivery"
 2000 – "The Hitch-hiker", an episode of Tales of the Unexpected
 2003 – Cold Case episode 1.10, "Hitchhiker", addresses similar murders of hitchhikers in Pennsylvania, Delaware, and New Jersey
 2004 – The L Word episode "Losing It"
 2006 - Lost episode "Further Instructions"
 2006 – The Masters of Horror episode "Pick Me Up"
 2007 – Peking Express, a Dutch/Flemish reality game show that follows a series of couples as they hitchhike to or from Beijing (in seasons 1–3) and South America (in seasons 4 and 5)

Fictional hitchhikers
 Augustin l'auto-stoppeur (by Belgian sculptor Gigi Warny)
 Hitchhiker – a hitchhiking lunatic killer played by actor Edwin Neal in the original film, The Texas Chain Saw Massacre (1974)
 Phineas, Ezra and Gus the Hitchhiking Ghosts – considered the mascots of the Haunted Mansion attraction, who also appear in other media, such as Disney's House of Mouse, The Haunted Mansion movie, and official merchandise
 Ford Prefect – a space-hitchhiking travel writer in The Hitchhikers Guide to the Galaxy
 The Hitcher – a green cockney man who was featured in The Mighty Boosh
 Jack Reacher - a character of the Lee Child novels

See also
 Murders of Jacqueline Ansell-Lamb and Barbara Mayo – two unsolved murders of hitchhikers in England in 1970
 Carpool
 Flexible carpooling – hitchhiking formalized via designated meeting points
 Freighthopping
 Hitchwiki
 Ridesharing company
 Slugging – hitchhiking motivated by HOV lanes in several urban areas

References

Bibliography
Brunvand, Harold (1981). The Vanishing Hitchhiker. American Urban Legends and Their Meaning. New York NY: Norton & Company. 
Griffin, John H. (1961). Black Like Me. Boston: Houghton Mifflin.
Hawks, Tony (1996). Round Ireland with a Fridge. London: Ebury. 
Laviolette, Patrick (2016). Why did the anthropologist cross the road? Ethnos: Journal of Anthropology. 81(3): 379–401.
Nwanna, Gladson I. (2004). Americans Traveling Abroad: What You Should Know Before You Go, Frontier Publishers, .
Packer, Jeremy (2008). Hitching the highway to hell: Media hysterics and the politics of youth mobility. Mobility Without Mayhem: Safety, Cars, and Citizenship. Chapel Hill: Duke Univ. Press (77–110).
Reid, Jack. (2020) Roadside Americans: The Rise and Fall of Hitchhiking in a Changing Nation. Chapel Hill: Univ, of North Carolina Press. 
Smith, David H. & Frauke Zeller (2017). The death and lives of hitchBOT: the design and implementation of a hitchhiking robot. Leonardo. 50(1): 77–8.
Sykes, Simon & Tom Sykes (2005). No Such Thing as a Free Ride. UK Edition. London: Cassell Illustrated. 
Tobar, Héctor (2020). The Last Great Road Bum. New York: Farrar, Straus and Giroux.
Kabourkova, Michaela (2022). Solo Female Traveller: What I Learnt from Hitchhiking in 70 Countries. Valencia: Amazon.

External links

 
Itinerant living
Hand gestures
Sustainable transport
Fingers